Engyodontium is a genus of fungi belonging to the group Hyphomycetes and contains about 6 species. This fungus was formerly included in Beauveria, but is now recognized as a distinct genus.

Outdoors it is common in soil and plant debris. Indoors, it can be found on paper, textiles, jute, and painted walls. The most common species is E. album. It forms a cottony, white colony producing numerous dry, tiny conidia. Production of mycotoxins by this fungus has not been reported at this time. It is an opportunist fungus and causes brain abscesses, keratitis, and native valve endocarditis to immunocompromised people.

References 

Hypocreales genera
Cordycipitaceae